Myelobia atrosparsellus is a moth in the family Crambidae. It is found in Brazil and Colombia.

References

Chiloini